North Norfolk Coast may refer to:
 The coast of North Norfolk, England
 North Norfolk Coast Site of Special Scientific Interest
 North Norfolk Coast biosphere reserve
 Norfolk Coast Path

See also
 Norfolk (disambiguation)